Pigment violet 23 is an organic compound that is a commercial pigment.  It is member of the dioxazine family of heterocyclic compounds, but derived from carbazoles. It is prepared by condensation of chloranil and 3-amino-N-ethylcarbazole.  It has a centrosymmetric angular structure.  For many years, the structure was assigned, incorrectly, as having a "linear structure" (EC no. 228-767-9, CAS RN 6358-30-1) which differ in terms of the carbazole ring fusion.

Pigment violet 23 is prepared by condensation of an aniline with chloranil.

References

Organic pigments